The KiddiComp concept, envisioned by Alan Kay in 1968 while a PhD candidate, and later developed and described as the Dynabook in his 1972 proposal "A personal computer for children of all ages", outlines the requirements for a conceptual portable educational device that would offer similar functionality to that now supplied via a laptop computer or (in some of its other incarnations) a tablet or slate computer with the exception of the requirement for any Dynabook device offering near eternal battery life. Adults could also use a Dynabook, but the target audience was children.

Part of the motivation and funding for the Dynabook project came from the need for portable military maintenance, repair, and operations documentation.  Eliminating the need to move large amounts of difficult-to-access paper in a dynamic military theatre provided significant US Department of Defense funding.

Though the hardware required to create a Dynabook is here today, Alan Kay still thinks the Dynabook hasn't been invented yet, because key software and educational curricula are missing.  When Microsoft came up with its tablet PC, Kay was quoted as saying "Microsoft's Tablet PC, the first Dynabook-like computer good enough to criticize". 

Toshiba also has a line of sub-notebook computers called DynaBooks. In June 2018, Sharp acquired a majority stake in Toshiba's PC business including laptops and tablets sold under the Dynabook brand.

Original concept 

Describing the idea as "A Personal Computer For Children of All Ages", Kay wanted the Dynabook concept to embody the learning theories of Jerome Bruner and some of what Seymour Papert— who had studied with developmental psychologist Jean Piaget and who was one of the inventors of the Logo programming language — was proposing. This concept was created two years before the founding of Xerox PARC. The ideas led to the development of the Xerox Alto prototype, which was originally called "the interim Dynabook".  It embodied all the elements of a graphical user interface, or GUI, as early as 1972. The software component of this research was Smalltalk, which went on to have a life of its own independent of the Dynabook concept.

The hardware on which the programming environment ran was relatively irrelevant.

At the same time, Kay tried in his 1972 article to identify existing hardware components that could be used in a Dynabook, including screens, processors and storage memory. For example:

The Dynabook vision was most fully laid out in Kay’s 1977 article "Personal Dynamic Media", co-authored with collaborator (and Smalltalk co-inventor) Adele Goldberg.

In 2019, Kay gave a detailed answer to a question on Quora, about the origins of the Dynabook concept.

Later works 

Since the late 1990s, Kay has been working on the Squeak programming system, an open source Smalltalk-based environment which could be seen as a logical continuation of the Dynabook concept.

He was actively involved in the One Laptop Per Child project, which uses Smalltalk, Squeak, and the concepts of a computer for learning.

References

External links 
 .
 .
 .
 .
 .
  about the Dynabook project and vision
 .
 .

History of human–computer interaction
Tablet computers
User interfaces
Xerox computers
History of computing hardware
Early laptops